The 2000 Malaysian Grand Prix (formally the II Petronas Malaysian Grand Prix) was a Formula One motor race held on 22 October 2000 at the Sepang International Circuit, in Sepang, Selangor, Malaysia. It was the 17th and final race of the 2000 Formula One World Championship, and the second Malaysian Grand Prix held as part of the Formula One World Championship. Ferrari driver Michael Schumacher won the 56-lap event from pole position. David Coulthard finished second for the McLaren team with Michael Schumacher's teammate Rubens Barrichello third.

Mika Häkkinen, driving for McLaren, started from second position alongside Michael Schumacher. However, Häkkinen was required to serve a ten-second stop-and-go penalty because he was judged to have jumped the start. Häkkinen was able to return to fourth position, his final finishing position. Coulthard, who started third, moved into the lead until the first round of pit stops. Michael Schumacher and teammate Barrichello traded the leading during their second stops with the former retaining the lead. Michael Schumacher held off Coulthard in the closing stages of the Grand Prix to secure victory.

Schumacher also tied Mansell's record of 108 points. Ferrari was confirmed as World Constructors' Champions as McLaren could not pass its points total in the final race. Coulthard's second-place finish helped to secure him third position in the World Drivers' Championship from Barrichello. The Grand Prix was Pedro Diniz and Johnny Herbert's final race; the Englishman retired after 161 race starts.

Background
The 2000 Malaysian Grand Prix was the seventeenth and final round of the 2000 Formula One World Championship and took place at the  clockwise Sepang International Circuit in Sepang, Selangor, Malaysia on 22 October 2000. It was the second running of the event to form part of the Formula One World Championship. Sole tyre supplier Bridgestone brought the Soft dry compound and the Intermediate, Heavy Wet and Soft wet-weather compounds to the race.

Before the event, Ferrari driver Michael Schumacher won the season's World Drivers' Championship at the preceding . Schumacher led the championship with 98 points; McLaren driver Mika Häkkinen was second on 86 points. A maximum of 10 points were available for the remaining race, which meant Häkkinen could not catch Schumacher. Behind Michael Schumacher and Häkkinen in the Drivers' Championship, David Coulthard of McLaren was third on 67 points, ahead of Ferrari's Rubens Barrichello in fourth on 58 points. Barrichello was still able to clinch third place if he won the race and Coulthard finished outside of the top six. Although the Drivers' Championship was decided, the World Constructors' Championship was not. Ferrari were leading on 156 points, and McLaren were second on 143 points, with a maximum of 16 points available. McLaren had to come first and second in the Grand Prix to become Constructors' Champions whereas Ferrari required one of its two drivers to finish second or score three points by achieving a fourth-place result to claim the title.

Prior to the event, protests over the imprisonment of Malaysian Deputy Prime Minister Anwar Ibrahim threatened to disrupt the race. The campaign group, known as Free Anwar, were reported in the media that they would use the Grand Prix in an attempt to bid for securing Ibrahim's release. However, the director of the campaign Raja Petra Kamarudin subsequently announced the event would be left untouched.

The weekend marked Jaguar driver Johnny Herbert and Sauber's Pedro Diniz final race. It was announced shortly beforehand that Herbert would move to the CART series and he confirmed that he rejected an offer to take up an testing position for the Williams team. Herbert said going into the weekend: "It's going to be a bit emotional getting out of the car for the last time and out of Formula One. But I'm really looking forward to the challenges that lie ahead of me." Diniz's future however was uncertain as he was rumored to be moving to Prost after undergoing extensive negotiations with the team.

Following the Japanese Grand Prix on 8 October, three teams conducted testing sessions at European race tracks between 10 and 13 October to prepare for the upcoming Grand Prix. Ferrari opted to spend the four days with test driver Luca Badoer. He tested new mechanical components on the F1-2000 car at the Fiorano Circuit on a wet/dry track. He later moved to the Mugello Circuit where he tried out brake testing, car set-ups, tyre evaluation, endurance runs for the car's engines and continued trying out new car components. Benetton cancelled a test in Barcelona during the period and decided to run at the Silverstone Circuit one week later using new Supertec engines angled at 110° degrees.

The Grand Prix was contested by eleven teams (each representing a different constructor) and all of them entered two drivers each. There were few alterations to cars for the Grand Prix since teams were focused on the design of their 2001 vehicles. Changes focused on the requirement to improve the cooling of the mechanical components of each car to cope in Malaysia's humid climate. Benetton installed a new engine specification in Alexander Wurz's car with a modified weight distribution.

Practice

There were four practice sessions preceding Sunday's race—two one-hour sessions on Friday, and two 45-minute sessions on Saturday. The Friday morning and afternoon sessions were held in hot and dry weather conditions. Several teams reported poor radio reception, possibly caused by the large grandstands situated around the track. Michael Schumacher set the first session's fastest lap, at 1 minute and 40.290 seconds, seven-tenths of a second quicker than teammate Barrichello. Coulthard was third quickest despite spending the majority of the session dealing with an clutch problem. Häkkinen set the fourth fastest time, ahead of Jaguar's Eddie Irvine and BAR's Jacques Villeneuve. Giancarlo Fisichella of Benetton, Herbert, Ricardo Zonta and Wurz (in his final race driving for Benetton) placed seventh through tenth. Some drivers went off the circuit and onto the grass during the session. 

In the second practice session, Häkkinen set the day's fastest time, a 1:40.262; Coulthard, his teammate, was the third fastest entrant. The Ferrari drivers remained quick—Michael Schumacher in second and Barrichello in fourth—although the latter started to experience flu symptoms. Jarno Trulli was fifth quickest for Jordan, ahead of Ralf Schumacher. Zonta ran quicker during the session and was seventh fastest. The Benetton drivers Fisichella and Wurz, along with Jordan driver Heinz-Harald Frentzen completed the top ten. Coulthard briefly drove onto the grass at the entry to KLIA Curve when he braked later than expected and went through the gravel to return to the racing line. Mika Salo abandoned his Sauber car in the gravel trap at Sunway Lagoon Corner after he lost control of his vehicle.

The weather remained hot and dry for the Saturday morning practice sessions. Lap times continued to decrease prior to qualifying later in the day. Wurz was the fastest driver in the third practice session with a lap of 1:38.318, three-thousands of a second quicker than Häkkinen in second. Coulthard set the third-quickest lap. The two Ferraris ran slower than the previous session; Michael Schumacher was fourth with Barrichello sixth. They were separated by Irvine in fifth. Zonta, Villeneuve and Ralf Schumacher followed in the top ten. An electronic engine sensor failure at the pit lane entry on his installation lap prevented Frentzen from setting a lap. 

In the final practice session, Coulthard lapped fastest at 1:38.109 despite going into the gravel traps in the session. Michael Schumacher, Wurz, Häkkinen and Barrichello were in positions two to five. Jaguar drivers Herbert and Irvine were sixth and seventh. Jenson Button of Williams was eighth after changing his car's engine that had a hydraulic issue. Villeneuve and Trulli were ninth and tenth. Fisichella and Minardi's Gastón Mazzacane spun and stalled their cars after spinning. Frentzen lost control of his car, got beached in a gravel trap and stalled with five minutes left. The top nineteen drivers set laps within 1.879 seconds of Wurz's time, indicating a competitive field for qualifying and the race.

Qualifying

Saturday's afternoon one hour qualifying session saw each driver limited to twelve laps, with the starting order decided by their fastest laps. During this session, the 107% rule was in effect, which necessitated each driver set a time within 107 per cent of the quickest lap to qualify for the race. The session was held in dry and hot weather. Michael Schumacher clinched his ninth pole position of the season, and the 32nd of his career with a lap time of 1:37.397 that he set with three minutes remaining after a second run with a rear wing alteration was aborted due to a flat-spotted tyre. He was joined on the front row of the grid by Häkkinen who recorded a lap 0.463 seconds slower than Schumacher and attributed the lost time to a car imbalance. Coulthard qualified third and had an anxious moment during a refuelling pit stop when a fire caused by a loose fuel line on his McLaren saw petrol seep into his left eye and admitted that the incident could have escalated had swift action not been taken. Barrichello, who still had the flu, qualified fourth having been demoted from second in qualifying's closing seconds. Wurz qualified fifth, in his best qualifying performance of the season. Villeneuve set the sixth fastest lap time despite having to walk to the pit lane when his car's engine was turned off due to a loss of power that slowed him on the straights during his final run. 

Irvine made set-up changes and secured seventh although he believed he could have been quicker as he slowed through turn 15. Ralf Schumacher in eighth lost four-tenths of a second on his fastest lap. Trulli and Frentzen were ninth and tenth for Jordan. Zonta missed qualifying in the top ten by two-tenths of a second, losing time due to a braking issue. Herbert, in his final Formula One race, qualified twelfth and had understeer following an engine change. He was ahead of Fisichella in 13th and Pedro de la Rosa in 14th whose fastest lap for the Arrows squad was recorded on a set of new tyres. Jos Verstappen, 15th, experienced an understeer that saw him make a driver error and sustain damage to a radiator that leaked water in his race car. He consequently drove Arrows' spare car. Button qualified 16th, encountering traffic during the session and could not lap faster since he was unable to scrub down his tyres. Salo in 17th had all four of his runs affected by outside circumstances and he lost downforce by following Irvine. Prost's Jean Alesi and Nick Heidfeld were 18th and 19th after climate-related performance issues. Understeer and a tyre mix up left Diniz 20th. The Minardi duo of Marc Gené in 21st and Mazzacane in 22nd completed the starting grid.

Qualifying classification

Warm-up
The drivers took to the track at 10:30 Malaysian Standard Time (GMT +8) for a half hour warm-up session. It occurred in warm and dry weather conditions. Lap times set in the session were approximately two-and-a-half seconds slower than observed in qualifying since vehicles were refitted with race-specific bodywork and radiators. Zonta set the fastest lap time, a 1:40.032, that he recorded with two minutes of the session remaining. Both McLaren drivers were within the first four positions—Häkkinen was second, lapping slightly slower than Zonta; Coulthard recorded the fourth-fastest time. They were separated by Michael Schumacher in third position.

Race

The race started at 15:00 local time. The conditions for the race were dry and cloudy with the air temperature  and the track temperature ; humidity was at 60 per cent. Tyre wear was not a major concern for the race. Cockpit temperatures were at their highest of the season due to the warm and humid climate. Häkkinen, who began alongside Michael Schumacher, jumped the start by moving early before appearing to stop before the start and then taking the lead. Coulthard accelerated faster off the line and passed Michael Schumacher on the outside for second position heading into the first corner. 

Further down the field at the second turn, Diniz attempted to pass Heidfeld who was alongside de la Rosa but he overshot the entry and crashed into the rear of Alesi's car, who was spun around and made contact with Heidfeld. De La Rosa was pushed into by Heidfeld; De la Rosa, Diniz and Heidfeld became the race's first retirements whilst Alesi managed to continue. Both Minardi drivers were forced wide in avoidance. On the same lap, Ralf Schumacher was forced onto the grass while attempting to pass Irvine, with Trulli damaging his front wing after making contact with the Jaguar. Trulli made a pit stop for a new front wing, whilst Verstappen spun off. These incidents prompted the safety car's deployment.

The safety car was withdrawn at the end of the second lap when it entered the pit lane and the race resumed with Häkkinen leading. Häkkinen allowed teammate Coulthard past for the lead on lap three and he was later overtaken by both Ferrari drivers after running wide at a corner during the same lap. At the competition of the third lap, Coulthard led from Michael Schumacher, Barrichello, Häkkinen, Wurz, and Villeneuve. Coulthard began to immediately pull clear of Michael Schumacher as he began setting consecutive fastest laps due to him driving a car with a light fuel load. On lap four, Häkkinen was given a ten-second stop-and-go penalty for jumping the start. Zonta moved into ninth position after overtaking Button and Herbert. Button lost a further position to Salo on the same lap. Meanwhile, Verstappen started to make up positions when he took 16th place from Gené. 

Häkkinen took his penalty on lap five, which lost him about 23.8 seconds due to the pit lane entry that is located on the outside of the final turn requiring drivers to take a longer line than those on the circuit, and he re-emerged on the circuit in 19th place. Frentzen went off the track and subsequently made a pit stop for repairs on the same lap. Verstappen overtook Ralf Schumacher for 14th position. Coulthard set a new fastest lap of the race, a 1:40.679 on lap seven and extended his lead over Michael Schumacher to 3.6 seconds, who in turn was 2.6 seconds ahead of teammate Barrichello. Wurz was a further 4.2 seconds behind Barrichello but was gradually drawing ahead of Villeneuve in fifth. Verstappen overtook Fisichella for eleventh before Frentzen entered the garage with a power steering failure on lap seven and retired after an exploratory lap. Trulli passed Mazzacane for 16th place on the following lap. Salo overtook Herbert for eighth position on lap nine, while Ralf Schumacher's car began to develop mechanical issues. On the tenth lap, Coulthard ran off the track at turn six, with debris penetrating his left-hand radiator inlet. This caused the engine temperature in Coulthard's car to increase, and McLaren were required to amend his race strategy when his engine overheated too much. Further down the field, Gené lost 13th position to Alesi, as Trulli made a pit stop for further repairs to his car. By the start of lap twelve, Coulthard had built a 5.6-second gap over Michael Schumacher, with Verstappen taking Button for tenth position. Häkkinen moved into 14th place after passing Ralf Schumacher and Gené within the following three laps. Salo and Alesi became the first drivers to make scheduled pit stops on lap 16. Coulthard made a pit stop one lap later to remove the debris from his radiator which eliminated his overheating issue. He rejoined the circuit in sixth position. The McLaren duo were on different strategies, with Coulthard making two pit stops and Häkkinen one. Button became the race's next retirement when his engine failed on lap 19. Michael Schumacher continued to set consecutive fastest laps, as he built an 8.8-second gap to Barrichello by his first pit stop on lap 24. Barrichello took over the lead for one lap before his pit stop on the following lap saw first place return to Michael Schumacher. 

By the end of lap 26, all of the leading drivers on two-stop strategies had taken their pit stops. The race order was Michael Schumacher, Coulthard, Barrichello, Herbert, Verstappen, and Villeneuve. Häkkinen passed Villeneuve on lap 28 although he went off the track in the process and relinquished the position to Villeneuve. Herbert made his only pit stop on the same lap although he stalled and rejoined the circuit in twelfth place. Gené, Mazzacane, Ralf Schumacher and Verstappen made pit stops between laps 28 and 29. Villeneuve tried to retake fourth position from Häkkinen at turn fifteen on the 30th lap but he braked later than expected. Häkkinen made a pit stop on lap 35, emerging behind Villeneuve and Irvine. Coulthard managed to close to within two seconds of Michael Schumacher when he made his second pit stop at the conclusion of lap 38. He returned to driving on a set of scrubbed front tyres. On the same lap, Gené stopped next to the pit lane barrier and retired from the Grand Prix with a left-rear wheel failure. 

Michael Schumacher made a pit stop on the following lap and remained in the lead. Barrichello became the leader for one lap and made his pit stop on lap 41. This allowed Michael Schumacher to reclaim the lead. By the start of lap 45, Coulthard had closed to within two seconds of Michael Schumacher. That lap saw Ralf Schumacher being called into his garage by his team to retire and prevent a failure of a malfunctioning engine oil supply system. Zonta pulled off into a gravel trap with an blown engine that incrementally became hotter two laps later. On the 50th lap, Herbert's car suffered a rear suspension failure under braking for the fourth corner, losing both his rear wheels. He went through the gravel trap and struck the turn four tyre barrier. Herbert exited his car unaided and was helped to a stretcher by track marshals for transport to the circuit's medical centre for precautionary x-rays. Mazzacane was the race's and season's final retirement with an engine piston failure on lap 54. 

He matched the record number of wins set by himself in 1995 and Nigel Mansell in 1992. Coulthard finished second in his McLaren, 0.7 seconds behind Michael Schumacher, Barrichello was third in the other Ferrari, with Häkkinen in fourth. Villeneuve in fifth achieved his third consecutive points-scoring finish and Irvine who was 1.8 seconds behind the former completed the points-scorers in sixth. Ferrari's results in the race won the team the 2000 World Constructors' Championship. Wurz, Salo, Fisichella, Verstappen and Alesi, Trulli who had a slow puncture and Mazzacane were the final classified finishers.

Post-race

The top three drivers appeared on the podium to collect their trophies and in the subsequent press conference. Michael Schumacher said that he and his team were delighted to win the race and the Constructors' Championship. He also added that he achieved victory with the use of team strategy after he realised Coulthard was quicker than him. Coulthard apologised to Michael Schumacher for the comments made by him about the German throughout the season. However, he also added he would not be retracting any comments made about Schumacher's driving style but the way in which they were expressed. Barrichello described his race as "lonely" because of the lack of on track action he experienced. He also said that the hot temperatures he experienced worrying him mentally due to his illness.

McLaren team principal Ron Dennis congratulated Ferrari and Michael Schumacher for winning both the Drivers' and Constructors' Championships. Michael Schumacher said he hoped that his success over the season would commence a new era of success with the Ferrari team. Similarly, their technical director Ross Brawn said he believed that the team could make further improvements in the following seasons: "We've got to build from this success and I'm sure we will do and get all the support from Italy and Ferrari that we will need to continue in this vein." Ferrari held an event at the Mugello Circuit in front of 50,000 people where they celebrated their success and thanked the team's fanbase for their continued support. 

Häkkinen stated that had he not received his stop-and-go penalty, he believed he could have won the race. He added that his car was stationary before the starting procedure was initiated, and admitted that his car moved before the sequence was completed. Norbert Haug, the head of Mercedes-Benz Motorsport, praised McLaren for their form and work over the course of the season and reflected on the race, "We had the speed again today, but Mika was penalised and got a stop and go. He was on the right strategy, but if you are in the pits for 10 seconds, you are not going to win. He still came in fourth and that is a great achievement. David also put a lot of pressure on Michael, until the final lap and that is a great performance." 

Villeneuve was happy to finish fifth considering how his vehicle had performed at the beginning of the season, saying, "We have made good progress and improved the car throughout the season. We have got to know the car better in terms of set-up, which has allowed us to push harder in races and challenge consistently for points." Irvine commented that he was pleased to finish the year scoring a single championship point with a sixth-place finish and that the result demonstrated the car's potential, adding, "There is obviously a lot of work to do over the winter, and if that goes well, I think we can start next season in a much better position."  

Despite his accident, Herbert suffered no physical injuries, except for a bruised left knee. He expressed disappointment in his late exit in his final Formula One race, saying that "I'm pretty disappointed to have a good race ruined by a failure such as that." He remarked, "I guess it was inevitable that, because I began my career being carried to the car, I would end it being carried out of it. There is nothing like ending your career with a bang!" Herbert left Formula One after 12 years with 161 race starts and 3 race victories. Jaguar technical director Gary Anderson traced the suspension failure to a broken link on the rear right suspension rod. Herbert continued to participate in motor racing in 2001 driving in the 24 Hours of Le Mans and the American Le Mans Series. He later abandoned plans to drive in CART and became a test driver for the Arrows team in February 2001. Diniz, meanwhile, could not find a race seat and became a shareholder in the Prost team to assist in helping the team become more competitive.

Race classification
Drivers who scored championship points are denoted in bold.

Championship standings after the race 
Bold text indicates the World Champions.

Drivers' Championship standings

Constructors' Championship standings

Note: Only the top five positions are included for both sets of standings.

References 

Malaysian Grand Prix
Malaysian Grand Prix
Grand Prix
Malaysian Grand Prix